Drachyovo is a rural locality (a selo) in Malyshevskoye Rural Settlement, Selivanovsky District, Vladimir Oblast, Russia. The population was 487 as of 2010. There are 3 streets.

Geography 
Drachyovo is located 33 km south of Krasnaya Gorbatka (the district's administrative centre) by road. Nagovitsyno is the nearest rural locality.

References 

Rural localities in Selivanovsky District
Melenkovsky Uyezd